Christina Mattoso Maia Forte (born 23 June 1967) is a Brazilian windsurfer. She competed in the 1992 Summer Olympics, the 1996 Summer Olympics, and the 2000 Summer Olympics.

References

External links
 
 
 

1967 births
Living people
Brazilian windsurfers
Female windsurfers
Brazilian female sailors (sport)
Olympic sailors of Brazil
Sailors at the 1992 Summer Olympics – Lechner A-390
Sailors at the 1996 Summer Olympics – Mistral One Design
Sailors at the 2000 Summer Olympics – Mistral One Design